St. Charles Borromeo Cemetery Church (German: Friedhofskirche zum heiligen Karl Borromäus) is a Roman Catholic church in the Vienna Central Cemetery in the 11th district, Simmering. It was constructed from 1908 to 1911 to designs by the architect Max Hegele. The church is a listed building.

The church is dedicated to Saint Charles Borromeo, archbishop of Milan from 1564 to 1584 and a cardinal.

See also 
 St. Charles Church, Vienna

External links 

 Official homepage

Art Nouveau architecture in Vienna
Art Nouveau church buildings in Austria
Church buildings with domes
Roman Catholic churches completed in 1911
Roman Catholic churches in Vienna
Vienna Central Cemetery
20th-century Roman Catholic church buildings in Austria
1911 establishments in Austria
Charles Borromeo